Bennett Cohen (born March 18, 1951) is an American businessman, activist and philanthropist. He is a co-founder of the ice cream company Ben & Jerry's.

Early life
Cohen was born in Brooklyn, New York, and raised in the town of Merrick, New York, on Long Island by Jewish parents Frances and Irving. He spent at least one summer at Buck's Rock Performing and Creative Arts Camp in New Milford, Connecticut. Cohen first met and befriended his future business partner Jerry Greenfield in a seventh grade gym class in 1963. They continued on to Sanford H. Calhoun High School. In his senior year, Cohen found work as an ice cream man before leaving to attend Colgate University in Hamilton, New York.

Over the next decade, Cohen pursued his interest in pottery and dropped out of college after his sophomore year. He also worked as a McDonald's cashier, Pinkerton guard, deliverer of pottery wheels, mop-boy at Jamesway and Friendly's, assistant superintendent, ER clerk, and taxi driver, before settling on work as a craft teacher at a private school for emotionally-disturbed adolescents. While teaching at the Highland Community School, Cohen began experimenting with making his own ice creams.

Ben &  Jerry's

In 1977, Cohen decided to go into business with his old friend Jerry Greenfield, and in May of the next year, the two men opened Ben & Jerry's Homemade Ice Cream Parlor in Burlington, Vermont. They initially intended to start a bagel business, but found the equipment costs prohibitive and switched to ice cream instead. They chose Burlington as a location because it was a prominent college town which, at the time, had no ice cream shop. Ben & Jerry's distinctive style of ice cream was developed to compensate for Cohen's anosmia, as he kept adding larger and larger chunks to the ice cream to satisfy his need for texture in food.
Cohen resigned as Chief Executive Officer of Ben & Jerry's in 1996.

Personal life

Social activism

As Ben & Jerry's gradually grew into a nationwide business and one of the largest ice cream companies in the U.S., Cohen turned his new-found wealth and prominence toward a variety of social causes, generally through the Ben & Jerry's Foundation. The Foundation receives 7.5% of all Ben & Jerry's pre-tax profits and distributes funds to organizations such as the Anti Displacement Project. Cohen also oversaw TrueMajority and Business Leaders for Sensible Priorities.

He is a vocal supporter of Democratic candidates and progressive causes. He supported Dennis Kucinich in the 2004 Democratic Party presidential primaries. In 2008, he initially supported John Edwards followed by Barack Obama.

In 2012, he helped launch the Stamp Stampede campaign to stamp messages on the nation's currency in support of passing a constitutional amendment to help overturn Citizens United v. Federal Election Commission and reduce the influence of private corporations on politics.

On April 18, 2016, Cohen was arrested, with Jerry Greenfield, while at a Democracy Awakening protest in Washington, D.C.

In July 2021, Ben and Jerry announced their support for the boycott of sales of Ben & Jerry's products in Israeli settlements in the occupied Palestinian territories in the West Bank. The editorial explicitly stated that the duo continue to support Israel, and saw no rejection of the country in objecting to some of its actions.

On October 10, 2021, Ben and Jerry were interviewed by Alexi McCammond of Axios on HBO. McCammond asked Ben about his political views regarding stopping the sales of ice cream in Israel. Ben was subsequently asked why Ben & Jerry's ice cream was sold in Georgia and Texas in response to Georgia's voter identification law and the 2021 Texas Heartbeat Act, which restricts abortions after 6 weeks. Ben replied by stating "I don't know," and "By that reasoning, we should not sell ice cream anywhere."

Bernie Sanders presidential campaigns
Cohen became a prominent supporter of Bernie Sanders during the 2016 Democratic Party presidential primaries.

Cohen debuted a special ice cream flavor called "Bernie's Yearning" on January 25, 2016 in support of Sanders. The flavor, released under the brand Ben's Best, consisted of plain mint ice cream covered by a solid layer of mint chocolate. According to Cohen, "The chocolate disk represents the huge majority of economic gains that have gone to the top 1 percent since the end of the recession. Beneath it, the rest of us." This was done in an effort to showcase the United States' current socioeconomic issues. The ice cream was made by hand in Cohen's kitchen with ingredients purchased by the Sanders campaign. Ben & Jerry's released a statement disavowing connection or support for the product, saying "This was created by Ben as a citizen. The company is not involved.”

On February 21, 2019, Cohen was named a national co-chair of Bernie Sanders' 2020 campaign. In August 2019, Cohen produced another Bernie Sanders flavor called "Bernie's Back." It was not for sale in stores, but was awarded as a prize to 40 contest winners.

Achievements 
 Cohen was honored by the New York Open Center in 2000 for his "leadership in pioneering socially responsible business."
 Cohen was a US Small Business Person of the Year in 1988.

References

External links
 Stamp Stampede
 

1951 births
Living people
American food company founders
American political fundraisers
American social activists
Ben & Jerry's
Businesspeople from New York City
Colgate University alumni
Jewish American philanthropists
New York (state) Democrats
Pennsylvania State University alumni
Businesspeople from Brooklyn
People from Burlington, Vermont
People from Merrick, New York
People from Williston, Vermont
American chief executives of food industry companies
Vermont Democrats
Activists from New York (state)
James Beard Foundation Award winners
Philanthropists from New York (state)
Bernie Sanders 2020 presidential campaign
Sanford H. Calhoun High School alumni